Bakbarabad-e Pir Dusti (also Romanized as Bākbarābād-e Pīr Dūstī; also known as ‘Alī Akbarābād-e Pīr Dūstī and ‘Alī Akbarābād) is a village in Itivand-e Shomali Rural District, Kakavand District, Delfan County, Lorestan Province, Iran. At the 2006 census, its population was 35, in 8 families.

References 

Towns and villages in Delfan County